The Wind in the Willows (released as Mr. Toad's Wild Ride in the United States) is a 1996 British adventure comedy film based on Kenneth Grahame's 1908 novel The Wind in the Willows, adapted and directed by Terry Jones, and produced by Jake Eberts and John Goldstone. The film stars Terry Jones, Steve Coogan, Eric Idle and Nicol Williamson. While positively regarded, it was a box office bomb and had distribution problems in the United States.

Plot 

Mole's underground home is caved in when the meadow above is crushed by a steam shovel, driven by the Weasels, who are demolishing it for a new location. Mr. Toad, had sold the land to finance his latest obsession: caravanning. Mole finds the Water Rat for solace. Seeing Mole's pain, Rat takes Mole to see Toad. Toad encourages them to join them in his newly bought horse-drawn caravan. A speeding motor car frightens the horse, tipping the caravan over. Toad instantly discards the cart and becomes infatuated with motoring. He is a terrible driver and funds his cars with loans from the Weasels. Their vindictive Chief blackmails him to sell Toad Hall.

After Toad's uncontrollable drive into the Wild Wood destroys a seventh motor car, Toad, Rat, and Mole are lost in the unwelcoming lair of the Weasels. The Weasels attempt to coerce Mole into stopping his friends from interfering with their plans. Toad is also attacked by the Weasels. The three end up in Mr. Badger's underground house. Badger, a close friend of Toad's late father who feels protective of Toad's inheritance, attempts to end Toad's love of motor cars. However, Toad refuses to listen to Badger and is ultimately arrested for stealing and crashing a motor-car outside a pub. During his trial, Toad's defence lawyer is no help at all due to Toad's obnoxious attitude. Furthermore, the Weasels are dominating the public box. The Chief Weasel poses as one of the rabbits in the Jury and manipulates the Jury to give a guilty verdict. After Toad insults the Court and makes a botched escape attempt, the Judge gives him a hundred-year sentence in a castle dungeon.

Back in Toad Hall, Rat and Mole are evicted by the Weasels, who have taken Toad Hall for themselves. Rat and Mole tunnel under the castle to free Toad, but he is helped by the kind-hearted Jailer's daughter and her sardonic Tea Lady Aunt. Toad escapes, disguised as the latter. Having left Toad's wallet in his cell, Toad, Rat, and Mole board an Engine No. 592, which is coupled to four coaches and pulls out, thanks to the engine driver's help of letting them ride on the footplate. The police, who have stowed away on the carriages behind the engine, demand that the train be stopped by waving furiously at Ratty, Moley, and the driver on the engine, much to Toad's fearing terror. As the engine goes to see what the police want and tries to stop the train, Toad confesses the truth and begs the driver to help him evade his captors about arresting him for stealing motorcars. Feeling sympathetic of what Toad says is true, the driver agrees to help as the police shoot the paint on his engine. Angered, he tosses coal from his engine's tender at the police, but fails to dodge a mail catcher, which catches him and ends up holding him from his train. Toad takes control of the train by pulling the accelerator to speed the engine up, and as Mole accidentally uncouples the coaches, he and Rat are left far behind with the coaches as the police hit a tunnel and hold on for dear life, Toad eventually derails the engine, and having survived the accident from the wreckage of the engine, sets off again, but is abducted by the Weasels.

The full extent of the Weasel's plans are now revealed: they have built a dog-food factory over the remains of Mole's abode and are planning to blow up Toad Hall and build a slaughterhouse in its place, with which they will turn all of the peaceful Riverbankers into dog food. They have also damaged the area near to Badger's home, which provokes him into wanting revenge against them. Badger and Rat attempt to infiltrate Toad Hall disguised as weasels, but are discovered. Along with Toad, they are placed over the factory's mincing machine. The Chief, Clarence and Geoffrey return to Toad Hall to prepare the victory celebration, leaving St. John in charge of the machine. Mole, who has broken into the factory, disables the machine allowing Toad, Badger and Rat to escape.

In a premature sense of victory, Clarence and Geoffrey attempt to murder their Chief using a birthday cake. Clarence and Geoffrey begin to fight each other for leadership, with the other Weasels drunkenly taking sides. This distraction allows the protagonists to stage a raid on the house, leaving all of the Weasels incapacitated in the ensuing fight. It turns out that the Chief has survived the coup against his life. Toad attempts to stop him from reaching the factory, which contains the detonator to blow up Toad Hall, to no avail. Unbeknownst to both of them, the explosives are actually in the factory (Rat had switched the labels on the explosive's containers earlier, leading the Weasels to believe the explosives were actually bone supplies for the factory), and as such the Chief blows himself up along with the factory, leaving Toad Hall intact and Toad's friends alive.

Afterwards, Toad makes a public speech swearing off motor cars and promising to be more mature and less selfish in the future. Mole's home has been repaired. However, Toad is seen secretly talking to an airplane salesman, which shows that he has only moved on to a new craze. Toad flies over the crowd in his new plane, causing mass hysteria and a disappointed Badger swears never to help Toad again. During the end credits, Toad flies across the country and eventually over the sea.

Cast 

 Terry Jones as Mr. Toad
 Steve Coogan as Mole
 Eric Idle as Rat
 Nicol Williamson as Mr. Badger
 Antony Sher as The Chief Weasel
 Michael Palin as The Sun
 Keith-Lee Castle as Clarence Weasel
 Robert Bathurst as St John Weasel
 Nigel Planer as The Car Salesman
 John Boswall as the Elderly Gentleman
 Stephen Fry as The Judge
 Roger Ashton-Griffiths as The Prosecution Counsel
 John Cleese as Mr. Toad's Lawyer
 Julia Sawalha as The Jailer's Daughter
 Victoria Wood as The Tea Lady
 Don Henderson as The Sentry
 Richard Ridings as The Guard
 Bernard Hill as The Engine Driver
 Nick Gillard as a stunt double
 Richard James as Geoffrey Weasel and Mole's Clock

Songs featured in the film
 "Messing About On The River" (Tony Hatch) – sung at the beginning by Rat, as he and Mole set out for a picnic on the river
 "Secret of Survival" – sung by the Weasels, explaining that they're only out for themselves
 "Mr. Toad" – sung by Toad, with lyrics taken directly from the novel, split into three sections (one covering his escape from Toad Hall, one during his trial and one after the train crash with SE&CR C Class 0-6-0 tender engine No. 592)
 "Friends Is What We Is" – sung by Toad, Badger, Mole and Rat, as they drive the Weasels out of Toad Hall and during the party at the end
 "Miracle of Friends" – the song played during the end credits

Production 
The Wind in the Willows was produced by Allied Filmmakers. Most of the then-living members of the Monty Python comedy troupe heavily participated in the film: Jones and Idle play major roles as Mr. Toad and Rat, but Cleese and Palin have minor roles, as Toad's inept defence lawyer and a sardonic talking Sun, respectively, who occasionally chastises Toad for his reckless behaviour, and briefly speaks to Ratty and Mole. Terry Gilliam was asked to voice "The River", but filming conflicts with 12 Monkeys kept him from doing so. Perhaps, as a result, "The River" only has one instance of dialogue - he is shown with a mouth and sings a couple of lines of the first song.

Filming 
Principal photography was done primarily during sunset, and the colours were then readjusted.
 Railway scenes were done on the Bluebell Railway, disguised as a part of the South Eastern & Chatham Railway (the Bluebell is home to a number of SE&CR locomotives, and as part of the old London, Brighton & South Coast Railway, the neighbouring railway to the SE&CR the disguise was not difficult to complete effectively). This is the first Willows adaptation to use the SE&CR - the railway in most versions is portrayed as the Great Western Railway (although the book's text is unspecific).
 The outside of Toad Hall: Kentwell Hall in Suffolk.
 External scenes of the Gaol: Dover Castle in Kent.
 The Old School, now the post office in Chiddingstone, is the Welcome Inn where Toad dines before stealing and crashing a motorcar.

Distribution 
When the film first appeared in the U.S. under its original title, it was pushed aside due to distributors' problems giving it a mere late 1997 limited release and very little promotion was published. Takings in the UK had been low due to largely only afternoon screenings. Subsequently, New York publications wondered why such a wonderful children's film was dumped by distributors. The Times published a very positive review by Lawrence Van Gelder.

In 1998, however, Disney released the film on VHS and later on DVD in 2004, but they changed the title to Mr. Toad's Wild Ride, to tie into their theme park ride at Disneyland (the Disney World version of which closed that year).

At the time of the US release, Jones, who was working on a documentary in New York, was told by telephone that the film was being shown in a cinema in Times Square. Jones rushed down to the square only to discover that the cinema was "one of those seedy little porno theatres."

Reception

Box office 
The film opened on 17 screens in Scotland and the Midlands on 11 October 1996 and grossed £6,121 in its opening weekend. It expanded to 230 screens on 18 October and grossed £375,795 for the week, placing seventh at the UK box office. It went on to gross £1.3 million in the U.K. and $72,844 in the U.S.

Critical response
The film holds a 75% approval rating on Rotten Tomatoes, and holds three stars out of five on the film critic website AllMovie.com. Film critic Mike Hertenstein wrote a positive critical review of the film.

The films won the Best of the Fest award at the Chicago International Children's Film Festival in 1998 and the WisKid Award at the Wisconsin International Children's Film Festival in 2000.

References

External links
 
 
 

1996 films
1990s children's comedy films
British children's comedy films
1990s English-language films
Films based on The Wind in the Willows
Films directed by Terry Jones
Films shot in England
Pathé films
Films with screenplays by Terry Jones
1996 comedy films
1990s British films
Films about weasels
British independent films